William Delaney (17 January 1866 – 16 December 1921) was an Australian cricketer. He played six first-class matches for South Australia between 1888 and 1893.

See also
 List of South Australian representative cricketers

References

External links
 

1866 births
1921 deaths
Australian cricketers
South Australia cricketers
Cricketers from Adelaide